Jack Richard Leftridge (April 14, 1944 – February 27, 2004) was an American football player.  He played fullback for a single season in the National Football League (NFL) with the Pittsburgh Steelers.

Leftridge was born in Hinton, West Virginia and played college football at  West Virginia University (WVU). Along with Roger Alford who entered in the same class, Leftridge was the first African American to play football at WVU.

1963: 79 carries for 393 yards and 5 TD. 10 catches for 89 yards and 2 TD.
1964: 125 carries for 534 yards and 5 TD. 3 catches for 23 yards.
1965: 144 carries for 744 yards and 8 TD. 9 catches for 77 yards and one touchdown.

Leftridge was selected by the Steelers with the third overall selection of the first round of the 1966 NFL Draft. He appeared in only four games in his professional career and his selection is considered by some as the worst draft pick in Steelers history.

References

1944 births
American football running backs
Players of American football from West Virginia
West Virginia Mountaineers football players
Pittsburgh Steelers players
People from Hinton, West Virginia
2004 deaths
African-American players of American football
20th-century African-American sportspeople
21st-century African-American people